The qualifying rounds for the 2007–08 UEFA Cup began on 19 July 2007. In total, there were two qualifying rounds which narrowed clubs down to 80 teams in preparation for the first round.

First qualifying round

|-
!colspan="5"|Southern-Mediterranean region
|-

|-
!colspan="5"|Central-East region
|-

|-
!colspan="5"|Northern region
|-

|}

First leg

Second leg

2–2 on aggregate, Käerjéng win on away goals

Liepājas Metalurgs win 3–2 on aggregate

SV Ried win 4–3 on aggregate

Dinamo Tbilisi win 2–0 on aggregate

Mattersburg win 4–3 on aggregate

Ekranas win 6–3 on aggregate

Drogheda win 4–1 on aggregate

3–3 on aggregate, Haka win on away goals

2–2 on aggregate, Mika win on away goals

Groclin win 1–0 on aggregate

2–2 on aggregate, Bełchatów win 4–2 on penalties

3–3 on aggregate, Artmedia Bratislava win on away goals

Young Boys win 5-1 on aggregate

2–2 on aggregate, Honvéd win 5–4 on penalties

Maccabi Tel Aviv win 4–1 on aggregate

Široki Brijeg win 6–3 on aggregate

Anorthosis Famagusta win 2–0 on aggregate

Rabotnički win 4–2 on aggregate

Partizan win 11–1 on aggregate

Zlaté Moravce win 4–2 on aggregate

Hajduk Split win 2–1 on aggregate

Omonia win 4–0 on aggregate

Slaven Belupo win 8–4 on aggregate

2–2 on aggregate, Besa Kavajë win on away goals

Litex Lovech win 7–0 on aggregate

FK Vojvodina win 7–1 on aggregate

Dinamo Minsk win 3–1 on aggregate

Helsingborg win 9–0 on aggregate

4–4 on aggregate, FC Midtjylland win on away goals

Häcken win 2–1 on aggregate

OB win 5–0 on aggregate

HJK Helsinki win 3–0 on aggregate

AIK win 9–0 on aggregate

Brann win 14–3 on aggregate

Vålerenga win 2–0 on aggregate

MYPA win 2–1 on aggregate

Sūduva Marijampolė win 4–1 on aggregate

Second qualifying round

|-
!colspan="5"|Southern-Mediterranean region
|-

|-
!colspan="5"|Central-East region
|-

|-
!colspan="5"|Northern region
|-

|}

First leg

Second leg

Lokomotiv Sofia win 3–1 on aggregate

Anorthosis Famagusta win 3–1 on aggregate

Rabotnički win 2–1 on aggregate

Galatasaray win 4–2 on aggregate

União de Leiria win 1–0 on aggregate

Sampdoria win 2–1 on aggregate

Standard Liège win 4–0 on aggregate

Hammarby win 3–2 on aggregate

AaB win 4–2 on aggregate

Vålerenga win 7–1 on aggregate

Häcken win 2–1 on aggregate

Brann win 6–4 on aggregate

FC Midtjylland win 7–3 on aggregate

OB win 5–1 on aggregate

Austria Wien win 5–4 on aggregate

Zenit Saint Petersburg win 5–0 on aggregate

Rapid Wien win 8–0 on aggregate

Blackburn win 3–0 on aggregate

Helsingborg win 4–1 on aggregate

AIK win 4–3 on aggregate

Sion win 4–1 on aggregate

Artmedia win 3–2 on aggregate

Dnipro win 5–3 on aggregate

Hamburg win 4–0 on aggregate

Lens win 6–2 on aggregate

Groclin win 3–0 on aggregate

Litex Lovech win 6–0 on aggregate

Erciyesspor win 4–2 on aggregate

Atlético Madrid win 5–1 on aggregate

Hapoel Tel Aviv win 6–0 on aggregate

CSKA Sofia win 3–2 on aggregate

Basel win 6–1 on aggregate

External links
Qualifying Rounds Information

Qualifying
July 2007 sports events in Europe
August 2007 sports events in Europe
UEFA Cup qualifying rounds